The men's 20 kilometres walk at the 2013 World Championships in Athletics was held at the Luzhniki Stadium and Moscow streets on 11 August.

The first leader was Takumi Saito who set the pace for the first 5K, opening up a gap on the pack, with his Japanese teammate Yusuke Suzuki the first to chase him down.  Suzuki moved out to a 13-second lead by the 10K mark.  The six chasers included all three 2012 Olympic medalists.  The first to catch him was bronze medalist Wang Zhen who pulled out to the lead only to get disqualified.  Even though he had received the notification, Wang continued until he was taken off the course.  Behind him, Olympic gold medalist Chen Ding, Erick Barrondo silver medalist and local favorite Aleksandr Ivanov took up the front, 22 seconds ahead of the next group.  But Barrondo picked up two red cards.

After 15K, Ivanov took off, with Barrondo giving chase.  First Ivanov picked up a red card and slowed down.  Then Barrondo picked up his third red card and was told to leave the race to his disbelief.  When Chen passed him, he raised his arm to wave good bye.  But Chen couldn't catch Ivanov, who took a ten-second victory in front of cheering Russian fans.

One walker gave a positive test at the competition: second last finisher Ebrahim Rahimian of Iran had used erythropoietin.

Records
Prior to the competition, the records were as follows:

Qualification standards

Schedule

Results

Final
The race was started at 17:00.

References

External links

20 kilometres walk results at IAAF website

20 kilometres walk
Racewalking at the World Athletics Championships